Sergio Pesavento (11 January 1958 - 6 March 2022) was a former Italian male long-distance runner who competed at one edition of the IAAF World Cross Country Championships at senior level (1982).

References

External links
 Sergio Pesavento profile at Association of Road Racing Statisticians

1958 births
Living people
Italian male long-distance runners
Italian male cross country runners